Celso José Pinto da Silva (29 October 1933 – 28 September 2018) was a Brazilian Roman Catholic archbishop.

Pinto da Silva was born in Brazil and was ordained to the priesthood in 1959. He served as titular bishop of Urusi and as auxiliary bishop of the Roman Catholic Archdiocese of São Sebastião do Rio de Janeiro, Brazil, from 1978 to 1981. Pinto da Silva then served as bishop of the Roman Catholic Archdiocese of Vitória da Conquista from 1981 to 2001. He then served as archbishop of the Roman Catholic Archdiocese of Teresina from 2001 to 2008.

Notes

1933 births
2018 deaths
20th-century Roman Catholic archbishops in Brazil
21st-century Roman Catholic archbishops in Brazil
Roman Catholic bishops of Vitória da Conquista
Roman Catholic archbishops of Teresina
Roman Catholic bishops of São Sebastião do Rio de Janeiro
People from Rio de Janeiro (city)